The men's pole vault event  at the 1991 IAAF World Indoor Championships was held on 9 March.

Results

References

Pole
Pole vault at the World Athletics Indoor Championships